Sonpur is a town and Village Development Committee in Dang Deokhuri District in Lumbini Province of south-western Nepal. At the time of the 1991 Nepal census it had a population of 8,650 persons living in 1129 individual households.

Since September 2015 Sonpur has been part of Lamahi Municipality.

References

External links
UN map of the municipalities of Dang Deokhuri District

Populated places in Dang District, Nepal